Lyse Lemieux (born 1936) is the former Chief Justice of the Quebec Superior Court from 1996 until 2004. Lemieux was the first and only woman to ever hold the office of Chief Justice in the Province of Quebec until the appointment of Marie-Anne Paquette in 2022.

Lemieux studied law at the Université de Montréal and was admitted to the Bar of Quebec in 1962. She held a variety of positions in the provincial government, becoming a specialist in expropriation. Lemieux was appointed a justice of the Superior Court of Quebec in 1978 and in 1994 was named an Associate Chief Justice. In 1996, she became the first woman to ever hold the office of Chief Justice in the Province of Quebec. She resigned after being charged with driving under the influence.

References

1936 births
Living people
Judges in Quebec
Lawyers from Montreal
French Quebecers
Université de Montréal alumni
Canadian women judges
Women chief justices
Canadian women lawyers